Barkov (masculine) or Barkova (feminine) is a Russian surname. Notable people with the surname include:

Alexander Barkov Sr. (born 1965), Russian ice hockey player and coach
Aleksander Barkov (born 1995), Finnish-Russian ice hockey player
Anna Barkova (1901–1976), Russian Soviet poet, journalist and writer
Dmitry Barkov (footballer) (born 1992), Russian footballer
Dmitri Barkov (sport shooter) (1880–?), Russian sport shooter
Ivan Barkov (c. 1732–1768), Russian poet and writer
 Roman Barkov, Barkov's Forces in Call of Duty: Modern Warfare in 2019

See also
Barkov Glacier, glacier of Antarctica

Russian-language surnames